Light curtains was first introduced as a "Light barrier" by invertor Dr. Erwin Sick on Sept 26, 1972 when he formally described this device as "Safety devices acting in conjunction with the control or operation of a machine; Control arrangements requiring the simultaneous use of two or more parts of the body with means, e.g. feelers, which in case of the presence of a body part of a person in or near the danger zone influence the control or operation of the machine the means being photocells or other devices sensitive without mechanical contact using light grids" in a patent application in Germany.  A year later, he followed up by also applying his patent idea in China, Italy, Japan, United States, Sweden and Great Britain.

This invention substantially lowered the costs of safeguarding personnel without adversely affecting the high requirements of reliability and safety which were until than relied upon such screens. The "Light Barrier" screen was also of compact, neat design and easy to manufacture and introduced the present Light curtain concept of a single energy source in quick temporal succession.

Light curtains are now more commonly known as opto-electronic devices that are used to safeguard personnel in the vicinity of moving machinery with the potential to cause harm such as presses, winders and palletisers. Light curtains can be used as an alternative to mechanical barriers and other forms of traditional machine guarding. By reducing the need for physical guards and barriers, light curtains can increase the maintainability of the equipment they are guarding. The operability and efficiency of machinery can also be improved by the use of light curtains by, for example, allowing easier access for semi-automatic procedures.

Description
Light curtains fall into a category of equipment known as presence detection devices. Other common presence detection devices are pressure-sensitive safety mats and laser scanners (often used on Remotely Operated Vehicles (ROV) when in industrial settings). Most important applications of safety relays are in automation industries dealing with robotic cell setup.

Light curtains are supplied as a pair with a transmitter and receiver. The transmitter projects an array of parallel infrared light beams to the receiver which consists of a number of photoelectric cells. When an object breaks one or more of the beams a stop signal is sent to the guarded equipment machine.

The light beams emitted from the transmitter are sequenced, one after the other, and pulsed at a specific frequency. The receiver is designed to only accept the specific pulse and frequency from its dedicated transmitter. This enables the rejection of spurious infrared light and thus enhances their suitability as components within a safety system.

Typically, light curtains are connected to a safety relay which will remove motive power from the hazard in the event that an object is detected. Safety relays can be provided with muting functionality which enables the temporary disabling of the safety function to allow objects to pass through the light curtains without tripping the safety relay. This is particularly useful for machinery which has some semi-automatic procedures.

Standards
The following partial list of standards should be used for guidance when implementing light curtains:

ANSI B11.19
IEC61496-1/-2
IEC/TS 62046;
ISO13855 (EN 999);

References

Occupational safety and health
Safety equipment

de:Lichtvorhang